Rock Action (stylized in uppercase) is a Southeast Asian English-language movie channel serving Southeast Asia, owned by Rock Entertainment Holdings.

Since its launched in 2014, it was originally known as RTL CBS Extreme, created by RTL CBS Asia Entertainment Network, a joint-venture of RTL Group and CBS Studios International which focuses on action-packed movies and broadcast in high-definition.

On January 1, 2018, RTL CBS Extreme was renamed Blue Ant Extreme after Blue Ant Media's acquisition of RTL CBS.

On August 18, 2021, Blue Ant Media Asia has rebrand their corporate name as Rock Entertainment Holdings, thus they will rebrand their channels as Rock Entertainment and Rock Extreme respectively.

On December 12, 2022, Rock Entertainment Holdings has restructured their contents, with the plan to focused on movies and special events, which Rock Extreme has been rebrand as Rock Action, which focus on action movies, on selected regions and TV provider.

See also
 Rock Entertainment

References

Television channels and stations established in 2022
Mass media in Southeast Asia
English-language television stations
Former CBS Corporation subsidiaries